The 2009–10 Swedish Figure Skating Championships were held at the Cloetta Center in Linköping between December 17 and 20, 2009. Skaters competed in the disciplines of men's singles, ladies' singles, and pair skating on the senior and junior levels, as well as two age-group levels of novice: Riksmästerskap (RM) and UngdomsSM (USM). The results were among the criteria used to choose the teams to the 2010 Winter Olympics, 2010 World Championships, and 2010 European Championships.

Senior results

Men

Ladies

Junior results

Men

Ladies

Pairs

Novice results

USM boys

USM girls

USM pairs

RM girls

External links
  
 2009–10 Swedish Championships results

Swedish Figure Skating Championships 2009-2010
Swedish Figure Skating Championships 2009-2010
2010
Figure Skating Championships 2009-2010
Figure Skating Championships 2009-2010
Sports competitions in Linköping